The 2022–23 3. Liga is the 15th season of the 3. Liga. It started on 22 July 2022 and will conclude on 27 May 2023.

The fixtures were released on 24 June 2022.

Teams

Team changes

Stadiums and locations

1 SpVgg Bayreuth will initially play their evening home matches at the Steigerwaldstadion since their home stadium, the Hans-Walter-Wild-Stadion, currently lacks floodlights. The club aims to fix this by the beginning of the season.
2 VfB Oldenburg will initially play their evening and winter home matches at the Heinz von Heiden-Arena since their home stadium, the Marschweg-Stadion, currently lacks floodlights and a heated pitch and is bound to noise regulation ordinances for matches after 18:30. The club aims to fix these problems and move back to Oldenburg as soon as possible.
3 SC Verl will play their home matches at the Home Deluxe Arena since their home stadium, the Sportclub Arena in Verl, does not meet 3. Liga standards.

Personnel and kits

Managerial changes

League table

Results

Statistics

Top scorers

Hat-tricks

Top assists

Clean sheets

Number of teams by state

References

External links
Official website

2022–23 in German football leagues
2022–23
Germany
Germany, 3